The ČSD Class S 499.0 and S 499.1 are essentially ČSD Class S 489.0 locomotives with revised gearing for higher speeds and added electrodynamic braking system. They operate from the 25 kV 50 Hz overhead line electrification system in both the Czech Republic and Slovakia. Their design can be traced back to the S699.0 locomotives produced by Škoda in 1962.

ČD's cargo division (ČDC) operate the locomotives in the Czech Republic. In Slovakia the fleet is shared almost equally between ZSSK's passenger division and ZSCS, their cargo operations.

Numbering
Locomotive 240.260-0 was converted from 230 060-6 in 2002 by fitment of class 240 bogies. It has a few other detail differences to a standard class 240 locomotive (weight is ( more for example).

During 2004 locomotives 240 049-7, 240 055-4 & 240 062-0 were converted to class 340 by fitment of 15 kV 16.7 Hz electrical equipment and ÖBB signalling/safety equipment.

See also
List of České dráhy locomotive classes

References

External links 

Rušne radu 240

Škoda locomotives
Bo′Bo′ locomotives
25 kV AC locomotives
Electric locomotives of Czechoslovakia
Electric locomotives of the Czech Republic
Electric locomotives of Slovakia
Railway locomotives introduced in 1968
Standard gauge locomotives of Czechoslovakia
Standard gauge locomotives of the Czech Republic
Standard gauge locomotives of Slovakia

Bo′Bo′ electric locomotives of Europe